Whitley County is a county located in the southeastern part of the U.S. state of Kentucky. As of the 2020 census, the population was 36,712. Its county seat is at Williamsburg, though the largest city is Corbin, and the county's District Court (a trial court of limited jurisdiction) sits in both cities. Whitley County is included in the London, KY Micropolitan Statistical Area.

History
The area now encompassed by Kentucky's Whitley County was first bounded in 1772, when all of what is now the state of Kentucky was in the frontier county of Fincastle County, Virginia. Fincastle was divided in 1776, with the western portion named Kentucky County, Virginia. In 1780, Virginia set aside all land in Kentucky County for soldiers who had served in the Revolutionary War. Kentucky County was divided into 3 counties, Jefferson, Fayette, and Lincoln. Lincoln County was divided in 1799, with part of becoming Knox County. On January 17, 1818, the Legislature removed the southwest portion of Knox to create a separate subdivision, named Whitley County.
 In 1912, some of the previous Whitley area was partitioned off to create McCreary County.

The new county was given the name of Whitley in honor of William Whitley, noted pioneer and Indian fighter. In the years prior to 1818, many skirmishes were fought between Indians and hunters and trappers in the area. Colonel William Whitley, is famous locally for fighting many of these battles within the area, safeguarding the Wilderness Road, as well as for his service in the War of 1812, where he was killed at the Battle of the Thames. The county seat, Williamsburg, is also named for Colonel Whitley, with the first court held at the home of the town's earliest resident, Samuel Cox.

Thomas Walker was the first known white man to see Whitley County. His expedition began in 1750. During his passage he named the Cumberland River, after the Duke of Cumberland. The estimated population of Whitley County in 1818 was 500. It had increased to 7,522 by 1860; that number includes 186 slaves. Extension of a railroad spur into Whitley County (1883) provided significant impetus to its continued growth. Industry began to flourish - primarily lumber mills and coal mines. The Whitley County courthouse burned in 1931. It was replaced with federal funding.

Its rugged terrain, densely forested woodlands, and a history of conflict with local Indian tribes all combined to make for a very slow rate of growth in Whitley County. The development of the coal mining industry in the area towards the late 1800s spurred on population growth as poor families from neighboring states rushed into the county and led to the formation of Corbin, still the largest city in Whitley County.

North Corbin, just north of Whitley County is home to Sanders Cafe, which is the birthplace of Kentucky Fried Chicken. It was founded there by Harland David Sanders, better known as Colonel Sanders, in 1930.

Law and government
The current elected officials of Whitley County are:

 County Judge/Executive: Pat White Jr.
 County Magistrate: Scotty Harrison
 County Magistrate: David Myers
 County Magistrate: Jamie Fuson
 County Magistrate: Robbie Brown
 County Attorney: Don R. Moses
 County Coroner: Andy Croley
 County Treasurer: Jeffrey Gray
 County Sheriff: Colan Harrell
 County Surveyor: Robert Moses
 Property Valuation Administrator: Ronnie Moses
 County Clerk: Kay Schwartz
 Circuit Court Clerk: Gary Barton

In congress Whitley county is served by Hal Rogers of the 5th congressional district.

Whitley County is a historically Republican county, and part of the pro-union bloc of southern Kentucky. Although it does not match the nearby counties of Clay, Leslie, Jackson, Owsley, Monroe and the newer McCreary (all originally formed from Whitley) in having never voted Democratic, the only Democrats who have carried the county were Woodrow Wilson in 1912 (when the Republican Party was bitterly divided) and Lyndon Baines Johnson over Barry Goldwater in 1964, with Goldwater losing by three votes.

Public corruption
From 2009 to 2011, young journalist Adam Sulfridge and his editor Samantha Swindler of the Times-Tribune (Corbin, KY) worked to expose corruption in the Whitley County Sheriff's Department. Then-Sheriff Lawrence "Larry" Hodge (R) was first elected in 2002. Sheriff Hodge built his reputation as a tough crime fighter, but most residents did not know the Sheriff accepted money in exchange for allowing defendants to walk free. Sheriff Hodge also stole seized firearms and drug evidence, according to the Times-Tribune and affidavits filed by the Bureau of Alcohol, Tobacco, Firearms and Explosives.

On November 8, 2010 (while he was still Sheriff), a Whitley County grand jury returned a 21-count indictment against Hodge. He remained Sheriff until the end of 2010, as he was defeated in the Republican Party primary earlier in the year (May) in a landslide by Colan Harrell, who won in the general election in November. In the late spring of 2011, Hodge appeared in United States District Court for the Eastern District of Kentucky in London and pleaded to an 'information.' That summer, Hodge was sentenced to 15.5 years in federal prison for drug trafficking, money laundering and extorting persons arrested by his department (with Williamsburg attorney Ronnie "Ron" W. Reynolds, who was sentenced to three years in federal prison for his part in the crimes). Kentucky state auditors determined at least $200,000 had been stolen or was otherwise missing from Sheriff Hodge's official accounts.

Geography

Whitley County is located within the Cumberland Plateau of southeastern Kentucky, which is greatly overlapped by the broad Eastern Coal Field region of the state. Cumberland Falls, in Cumberland Falls State Resort Park, is the largest waterfall in Kentucky. Both Daniel Boone Forest and Cumberland Falls State Park are operated by the Kentucky State Parks system, also located in the county. The county contains two regionally significant waterways, the Laurel and Cumberland rivers.

Geographic features

 Cumberland Falls
 Cumberland Plateau
 Cumberland River
 Jellico Mountain
 Laurel River
 Laurel River Lake

Adjacent counties

 Laurel County - north
 Knox County - northeast
 Bell County - east
 Claiborne County, Tennessee  - southeast
 Campbell County, Tennessee - south
 McCreary County - west

National protected area
 Daniel Boone National Forest (part)

Transportation

Major highways

 Interstate 75
 U.S. Route 25W
 Kentucky Route 11
 Kentucky Route 26
 Kentucky Route 90
 Kentucky Route 92
 Kentucky Route 312
 Kentucky Route 904

Airport
 KBYL, Williamsburg-Whitley County Airport

Demographics

As of the census of 2000, there were 35,865 people, 13,780 households, and 9,894 families residing in the county. The racial makeup of the county was 98.37% White, 0.34% Black or African American, 0.23% Native American, 0.20% Asian, 0.01% Pacific Islander, 0.09% from other races, and 0.76% from two or more races. 0.69% of the population were Hispanics or Latinos of any race.

There were 13,780 households, out of which 33.70% had children under the age of 18 living with them, 54.90% were married couples living together, 13.00% had a female householder with no husband present, and 28.20% were non-families. 25.20% of all households were made up of individuals, and 10.20% had someone living alone who was 65 years of age or older. The average household size was 2.52 and the average family size was 3.01.

The age distribution was 25.80% under 18, 10.80% from 18 to 24, 27.30% from 25 to 44, 23.20% from 45 to 64, and 12.90% who were 65 or older. The median age was 35 years. For every 100 females, there were 93.30 males.  For every 100 females age 18 and over, there were 89.60 males.

The median income for a household in the county was $22,075, and the median income for a family was $27,871. Males had a median income of $26,518 versus $17,001 for females. The per capita income for the county was $12,777.  About 21.60% of families and 26.40% of the population were below the poverty line, including 34.10% of those under age 18 and 19.00% of those age 65 or over.

Economy
Whitley County's economy has always relied heavily on its natural resources, particularly coal and timber from the area's heavily forested, mountainous terrain. Due to the rough territory created by the Cumberland Mountains, agriculture in the county has historically been less significant, although tobacco and corn are grown in some areas.

Education

K-12
Three public school districts serve the county:
 Whitley County School District
 The largest of the three districts, it serves the county outside of the cities of Corbin and Williamsburg.
 Williamsburg Independent School District
 Serves the city of Williamsburg with a single K-12 school.
 Corbin Independent School District
 Serves the entire city of Corbin, making it one of the few districts in Kentucky whose boundaries cross county lines.

Colleges and universities
The University of the Cumberlands (formerly known as Cumberland College), located in Williamsburg, is the largest private university in Kentucky, and the only university with its main campus in Whitley County. The school's sports teams play on the NAIA level and provide college level sporting events for the local community.

In addition, Eastern Kentucky University maintains a branch campus in the Whitley County portion of Corbin just outside Woodbine.

Alcohol sales
Whitley County, which had historically been dry, is now officially classified by the state as a moist county - sale of alcohol in the county is prohibited except in certain areas as voted on by the residents of the area, including at least one area of the county allowing full retail alcohol sales. In Whitley County, the areas that permit alcohol sales are:
 The city of Corbin voted in February 2012 to allow full retail alcohol sales in the city limits after voting in 2006 to allow by the drink alcohol sales in qualifying restaurants.
 The city of Williamsburg voted in June 2016 to allow full retail alcohol sales in the city limits after voting in 2012 to allow by the drink alcohol sales in qualifying restaurants.

Communities

Cities
 Corbin (partly in Knox County)
 Williamsburg (county seat)

Census-designated places
 Emlyn
 Pleasant View
 Rockholds
 Mountain Ash

Unincorporated communities

 Canada Town
 Carpenter
 Gatliff
 Goldbug
 Julip
 Packard
 Piney Grove
 Saxton
 Siler
 Wofford
 Woodbine
 Yaden

See also

 National Register of Historic Places listings in Whitley County, Kentucky

References

External links

 The Kentucky Highlands Project

 
Kentucky counties
London, Kentucky micropolitan area
Counties of Appalachia
1818 establishments in Kentucky
Populated places established in 1818